St. Louis Christian College was a private Bible college in Florissant, Missouri. It was theologically and ecclesiastically associated with the Restoration Movement of Christian Churches and Churches of Christ. It was accredited by the Association for Biblical Higher Education.

In August 2021, the trustees of Central Christian College of the Bible and Saint Louis Christian College approved a merger of their institutions, which was completed with the approval and assistance of The Solomon Foundation, the owner of both campuses. The Missouri Secretary of State accepted the merger agreement on December 5, 2022.

References

External links
 Official website

Association for Biblical Higher Education
Seminaries and theological colleges in Missouri
Universities and colleges affiliated with the Christian churches and churches of Christ
Educational institutions established in 1956
Universities and colleges in St. Louis County, Missouri
Association of Christian College Athletics member schools
1956 establishments in Missouri
Buildings and structures in St. Louis County, Missouri